is a railway station in Higashi-ku, Nagoya, Aichi Prefecture,  Japan, operated by Meitetsu.

Lines

Station layout
The station has one dead-headed underground island platform. The station has automated ticket machines, Manaca automated turnstiles and is staffed.

Adjacent stations

|-
!colspan=5|Nagoya Railroad

Station history
Sakaemachi Station was opened on August 20, 1978. On December 16, 2006, the Tranpass system of magnetic fare cards with automatic turnstiles was implemented.

Passenger statistics
In fiscal year 2017, the station was used by an average of 20,623 passengers daily.

See also
 List of Railway Stations in Japan

References

External links

 Official web page 

Railway stations in Japan opened in 1978
Railway stations in Aichi Prefecture
Stations of Nagoya Railroad
Railway stations in Nagoya
Sakae, Nagoya